Dryophylax almae is a species of snake in the family Colubridae. The species is endemic to Brazil.

Etymology
The specific name, almae, is in honor of Brazilian herpetologist Sylvia Alma Renata Lemos Romano-Hoge.

Geographic range
D. almae is found in the Brazilian states of Alagoas, Amazonas, Bahia, Ceará, Paraíba, Pernambuco, Piauí, and Rio Grande do Norte.

Habitat
The preferred natural habitat of D. almae is shrubland.

Description
Pale in coloration for its genus, D almae has keeled dorsal scales, which are arranged in 19 rows at midbody and in 15 rows posteriorly.

Reproduction
D. almae is viviparous.

References

Further reading
Barbosa DBS, Lima MSCS, Guedes TB (2020). "First record of Thamnodynastes almae Franco & Ferreira, 2002 (Serpentes, Dipsadidae, Xenodontinae) in the state of Piauí, northeastern Brazil, and updated distribution map". Check List 16 (5): 1323–1328.
Franco FL, Ferreira TG (2003). "Descrição de uma nova espécie de Thamnodynastes Wagler, 1830 (Serpentes, Colubridae) do nordeste brasileiro, com comentários sobre o gênero". Phyllomedusa 1 (2): 57–74. (Thamnodynastes almae, new species). (in Portuguese, with an abstract in English).

Dryophylax
Snakes of South America
Reptiles of Brazil
Endemic fauna of Brazil
Reptiles described in 2003